Rhinolithodes wosnessenskii, also called the rhinoceros crab or golf-ball crab, is a species of king crab, the only species in the genus Rhinolithodes. The species is named after Ilya Gavrilovich Voznesenski.

The legs are covered in spines and long setae. It lives in crevices on rocky or gravel bottoms, and is only rarely encountered.

References

King crabs
Crustaceans of the eastern Pacific Ocean
Monotypic arthropod genera